Voronezh State University of Forestry and Technologies is a university in Voronezh, Russia

History
In 1918, a forestry department was opened as part of Voronezh Agricultural Institute. In 1923, it was reorganized into a Forestry Faculty. In 1930, Voronezh Agricultural Institute was divided into several  institutes and Voronezh Institute of Forestry Engineering was established on the basis of the Forestry Faculty.

The university changed its name several times: Forestry Institute (1930–1931), Institute of Forestry (1932–1935), Silvicultural Institute (1936–1937), Forestry Institute (1938–1955), Forestry Ingineering Institute (1956–1980), Forestry Institute of the order of Friendship of Peoples (1980–1994), Academy of Forestry Engineering (1994–2015), Voronezh State University of Forestry and Technologies named after G. F. Morozov (2015).

In 1952-1953 the Institute's arboretum was established at the field site opposite the main building covering an area of 3.5 hectares. This work was done by the students and professors. One of the founders of the arboretum was E. N. Naumenko.

In 1980 the University celebrated its 50th anniversary, after which it was awarded the order of Friendship of Peoples.

Rectors
 Tyurin A. V. 1930
 Bobkov A. V. 1931
 Krylatykh A. R. 1931-1937
 Rychkov G. S. 1937 1938
 Kuvshinov Y. I. 1938-1941
 Fortunatov N. I. 1942-1945
 Palenko L. A. 1945-1951
 Rubtsov V. I. 1951-1962
 Zhitkov P. N. 1962-1964
 Dudarev A. D. 1964-1971
 Artyukhovsky A. K. 1971-1985
 Popov V. K. 1985-2005
 Bugakov V. M. 2005 - 2015
 Drapaluk M. V. 2015–present

Faculties, fields and profiles of training 
 Faculty of Forestry
 Automobile Faculty 
 Faculty of Forestry Industry 
 Faculty of Economics
 Faculty of Mechanics 
 Faculty of Distance Learning 
 Center for Distance Education
 Centre for Additional Professional Education

References 

Universities in Russia
Voronezh
1930 establishments in Russia
Educational institutions established in 1930
Public universities and colleges in Russia